Amesergide (developmental code name LY-237733) is a serotonin receptor antagonist of the ergoline and lysergamide families related to methysergide which was under development by Eli Lilly and Company for the treatment of a variety of conditions including depression, anxiety, schizophrenia, male sexual dysfunction, migraine, and thrombosis but was never marketed. It reached phase II clinical trials for the treatment of depression, erectile dysfunction, and premature ejaculation prior to the discontinuation of its development.

Pharmacology

Pharmacodynamics
Amesergide acts as a selective antagonist of the serotonin 5-HT2A, 5-HT2B, and 5-HT2C receptors (Ki = 1.96–15.1 nM). It is also an antagonist of the serotonin 5-HT7 receptor with relatively lower affinity (Ki = 78.0 nM). The drug is a potent antagonist of the α2-adrenergic receptor in addition to the 5-HT2 receptors via its major active metabolite 4-hydroxyamesergide (Ki = 13 nM). This profile of activity is similar to that of the so-called noradrenergic and specific serotonergic antidepressant (NaSSA) mirtazapine (Remeron).

Amesergide also has affinity for the serotonin 5-HT1D receptor (Ki = 57.9 nM) and lower affinity for the serotonin 5-HT1A, α1-adrenergic, and dopamine D1 and D2 receptors (Ki = 150–730 nM). It has negligible affinity for the histamine H1 and muscarinic acetylcholine receptors (Ki > 10,000 nM). The drug does not appear to have been assessed at the serotonin 5-HT1E, 5-HT1F, 5-HT4, 5-HT5A, and 5-HT6 receptors, nor at the dopamine D3, D4, and D5 receptors.

References

External links
 
 Amesergide - AdisInsight

5-HT2A antagonists
5-HT2B antagonists
5-HT2C antagonists
5-HT7 antagonists
Abandoned drugs
Alpha-2 blockers
Antidepressants
Anxiolytics
Isopropyl compounds
Lysergamides